This is a list of episodes from 2009 for the Stuff You Should Know podcast.

2009 season

References

External links 
Podcast Archive

Lists of radio series episodes